Ronald D. "Ron" Slotin (born 1963/64) is an American politician from the state of Georgia. He ran in the 2017 special election to represent  in the United States House of Representatives, but was unsuccessful.

Slotin is Jewish.

References

Living people
1960s births
Democratic Party Georgia (U.S. state) state senators
Jewish American state legislators in Georgia (U.S. state)
University of Georgia alumni
People from Sandy Springs, Georgia
21st-century American Jews